Richard Wagner  (born April 2, 1957) is a Canadian jurist serving as the 18th and current chief justice of Canada since 2017. He previously served as a puisne justice of the Quebec Court of Appeal (2011–2012) and of the Supreme Court of Canada (2012–2017). For several months in 2021, following Julie Payette's resignation as Canada's governor general, Wagner was the administrator of the government of Canada as well as chief justice.

Early life
Wagner was born in Montreal, Quebec, the son of Gisèle (née Normandeau) and Claude Wagner, a former member of Parliament and senator. He studied at the Collège Jean-de-Brébeuf in Montreal before receiving a bachelor of social science in political science from the University of Ottawa in 1978. He received his Licentiate in Law (LL.L.) – a civil law equivalent of the Bachelor of Laws (LLB) or Juris Doctor (JD) – from the same institution in 1979.

Career

Private practice and early judicial career 
In 1980, Wagner was called to the Quebec Bar, and began practice at the Montreal law firm Lavery, de Billy (formerly Lavery, O'Brien and Lavery, Johnston, Clark, Carrière, Mason & Associés). His practice centred on real estate, commercial litigation and professional liability insurance.

He was appointed to the Quebec Superior Court for the district of Montreal on September 24, 2004. On February 3, 2011, he was elevated to the Court of Appeal of Quebec.

Supreme Court of Canada
On October 2, 2012, Prime Minister Stephen Harper nominated him to the Supreme Court of Canada to replace retiring Justice Marie Deschamps. His appointment was confirmed on October 5, 2012.

On December 3, 2012, a ceremony was held for Wagner's appointment in the Supreme Court of Canada courtroom. The event was attended by outgoing chief justice Beverley McLachlin, the federal minister of justice and attorney general, Rob Nicholson and the Quebec deputy minister of justice, Nathalie G. Drouin.

On December 12, 2017, Prime Minister Justin Trudeau appointed Wagner as Beverly McLachlin's successor as chief justice of Canada.

Wagner has volunteered to judge law school moot competitions.

Administrator of Canada 
On January 23, 2021, Wagner became Administrator of the Government of Canada following Governor General Julie Payette's resignation in response to a workplace harassment investigation. By virtue of royal letters patent issued in 1947, the chief justice of Canada is the ex officio principal deputy to the governor general, and may act as governor general when the office is vacant. Only justices of the Supreme Court of Canada are authorized to perform federal viceregal duties on an acting basis. He ceased to hold office as administrator on July 26, 2021, following Mary Simon's appointment as governor general. Serving for six months, Wagner was the longest-serving administrator of Canada in history.

Personal life
Wagner is a Roman Catholic. Wagner's father Claude was also a jurist. His grandfather was a German Jewish immigrant originally from Bavaria. Wagner has two children who are also lawyers.

Honours

Scholastic
Honorary degrees

Memberships and fellowships

See also
 Reasons of the Supreme Court of Canada by Justice Wagner

References

1957 births
Judges in Quebec
Living people
University of Ottawa alumni
People from Montreal
Justices of the Supreme Court of Canada
Canadian people of German-Jewish descent
Canadian Roman Catholics
French Quebecers
University of Ottawa Faculty of Law alumni
Members of the King's Privy Council for Canada
Chief justices of Canada
21st-century Canadian judges